is a Japanese politician of the Liberal Democratic Party (LDP), a member of the House of Representatives in the Diet (national legislature). A native of Etajima, Hiroshima and graduate of the University of Tokyo he jointed the Ministry of Construction in 1972 and attended the University of Pennsylvania in the United States as a ministry official. Leaving the ministry in 2001, he ran unsuccessfully for the House of Representatives as an independent in 2003. He ran again in 2005 as a member of the LDP and was elected for the first time. He has represented the 2nd District of Hiroshima prefecture from 2005 to 2009, and again from 2012 to the present.

References

External links 
 Official website in Japanese.

1948 births
Living people
People from Etajima, Hiroshima
Politicians from Hiroshima Prefecture
University of Tokyo alumni
University of Pennsylvania alumni
Koizumi Children
Members of the House of Representatives (Japan)
Liberal Democratic Party (Japan) politicians